AGPL may refer to:

Actual Ground Position Line, the current line dividing Indian and Pakistani forces in the Siachen Glacier
Affero General Public License, a type of free software license
GNU Affero General Public License, a free software license intended as a replacement for the original Affero GPL